Jennifer Packer (born 1984) is a contemporary American painter and educator based in New York City. Packer's subject matter includes political portraits, interior scenes, and still life's, featuring contemporary Black American experiences through her work. She paints portraits of contemporaries, funerary flower arrangements, and other subjects through close observation. Primarily working in oil paint, her style uses loose, improvisational brush strokes and a limited color palette.

Early life and education
Packer was born and raised in Philadelphia, Pennsylvania. She attended Tyler School of Art and Architecture at Temple University where she earned her Bachelor of Fine Arts in 2007. In 2012, she graduated from Yale University with a Master of Fine Arts in painting and printmaking.

Work
After completing her MFA, Packer moved to the Bronx, and later became an assistant professor in the painting department at Rhode Island School of Design where she continues to teach. She was the 2012–2013 Artist-in-Residence at the Studio Museum in Harlem, and a Visual Arts Fellow at the Fine Arts Work Center from 2014 to 2016.

Themes within art
 
Packer has been inspired by social justice movements, which can be seen through her floral work representing institutional violence against Black Americans and the resulting grief. For her portraits, she depicts friends and family in an intimate style that is meant to avoid a straightforward reading. In 2013, she made art featuring body parts such as fingers, knees, and protruding jaw lines of straining bodies emerging from the haze, an example of which is Lost In Translation. In 2017, Transfiguration (He's No Saint) shows a young African-American man wearing glasses with two raised arms. The majority of his body is rendered dramatically in brilliant yellow, red, and green. This work represents the prevention of a stop and search of a Black man by police. Circular parts on his flesh signify the marks of stigmata. The figure's eyes are half closed, indicating loss of what he is or expects out of the world. The Mind Is Its Own Place (2020) shows a level of depression and complexity of the human mind within her work through a limited palette in a charcoal drawing.

Settings on art
 
Packer's subjects are African Americans, and her themes center around oneness. Her art is political, recognizing the social discord all people witness or are affected by in this generation. Despite her art not focusing on the entirety of social injustice, it does bring an awareness to inequality within the United States. Visually Impaired is one of her early works which expresses realization and abstraction. If you look at the detail of the art piece, it intends to resemble Ferdinand Holder's 19th century deathbed art pieces. In some of her 2017 artwork, she aimed to achieve contrast and depth. Say Her Name, a flower oil canvas piece, is another example created as a growing flower drawn like a forest. According to a video interview, in most of her early works she decides to create a memento, a slight reference in her artwork to a past artist she was either inspired by or had similar real life goals in art. Packer tends to draw most human figures with realistic details.

Artistic practice
Packer paints expressionist portraits, interior scenes, and still life. She is interested in authenticity, encounters, and exchanges in relation to her painting practice. The models for her portraits are often friends or family members.

In her 2020 exhibition at the Serpentine Gallery in London, her expressionistic paintings were all in oils on canvas. Blessed Are Those Who Mourn (Breonna! Breonna!) shows her reaction to the killing of Breonna Taylor. A painting of flowers, a traditional form of still life, was used in Say Her Name to reference the death of Sandra Bland. Other portraits indicate inspiration from western sources as diverse as Henri Matisse and Caravaggio as well as Americans Kerry James Marshall and Philip Guston.

Packer is currently an assistant professor of painting at the Rhode Island School of Design. She was formerly Artist-in-Residence at the Studio Museum in Harlem (2012–2013) and a Visual Arts Fellow at the Fine Arts Work Center in Provincetown, Massachusetts (2014–2016). She was included in the 2019 traveling exhibition Young, Gifted, and Black: The Lumpkin-Boccuzzi Family Collection of Contemporary Art.

Selected exhibitions
Group show, Fore, curated by Lauren Haynes, Naima J. Keith and Thomas J. Lax at The Studio Museum in Harlem (2012)
Solo exhibition, Treading Water, Corvi-Mora, London (2015)
Solo exhibition at Sikkema Jenkins & Co (2018); Packer exhibited a large diptych titled Laquan, a colorful still life of palm fronds and fiery peonies, named after Laquan McDonald, a Black teenager murdered by a Chicago policeman in 2014
2019 Whitney Biennial, curated by Rujeko Hockley and Jane Panetta
Solo exhibition, Serpentine Gallery, London, 2020
Solo exhibition, Museum of Contemporary Art, Los Angeles, 2021 
Solo exhibition, Prospect New Orleans, Ogden Museum of Southern Art, New Orleans, Louisiana, 2021

Awards
In 2013, Packer was awarded the Rema Hort Mann Grant. In 2012–2013, Packer was an Artist-in-Residence at The Studio Museum in Harlem, and from 2014 to 2016, a Visual Arts Fellow at the Fine Arts Work Center in Provincetown, Massachusetts.

In 2020, she won the Hermitage Greenfield Prize, which included a commission to produce a new work that will premiere in 2022 at the John and Mable Ringling Museum of Art in Sarasota, Florida. That same year, she also won the Rome Prize at the American Academy in Rome.

References

Perree, Rob. “Jennifer Packer.” AFRICANAH.ORG, 8 May 2014, 
https://africanah.org/jennifer-packer/.

Hardin, Marques. "Artist Spotlight: Jennifer Packer". Blog.Artgence.Co, 2022, https://blog.artgence.co/post/artist-spotlight-jennifer-packer.

"Jennifer Packer: The Eye Is Not Satisfied With Seeing - Serpentine Galleries". Serpentine Galleries, 2022, https://www.serpentinegalleries.org/whats-on/jennifer-packer

Phillips, Claire. “Jennifer Packer: The Eye Is Not Satisfied with Seeing.” The Brooklyn Rail, 28 Jan. 2021, https://brooklynrail.org/2021/02/artseen/Jennifer-Packer-The-Eye-Is-Not-Satisfied-With-Seeing

Grytnaki, Gelly. The Power Of Colour-The Brilliant Painting Of Jennifer Packer". Gelly Gryntaki, 2022, http://www.art-cat.gr/texts/category/siro41l9gft27uqmdhzyhl17ft27mf

D’Souza, Aruna. "Jennifer Packer: Painting As An Exercise In Tenderness". Nytimes.Com, 2022, https://www.nytimes.com/2021/11/18/arts/design/jennifer-packer-whitney.html

Cat, Art. “The Power of Colour-the Brilliant Painting of Jennifer Packer.” Gelly Gryntaki, Gelly Gryntaki, 13 July 2021, http://www.art-cat.grm

External links
Artist Jennifer Packer on Black Female Subjectivity - The New York Observer
Jennifer Packer - ContemporaryArtDaily.com
Jennifer Packer - Sikkema Jenkin & Co.

https://africanah.org/jennifer-packer

 

1985 births
Living people
21st-century American artists
African-American women artists
African-American painters
People from Philadelphia
Temple University Tyler School of Art alumni
Yale School of Art alumni
Rhode Island School of Design faculty
American women academics
21st-century American women
21st-century African-American women
21st-century African-American artists
20th-century African-American people
20th-century African-American women